José María Buruca, also known as José Buruca Laforia (Atalaya, Spain, 16 May 1884 - Buenos Aires, Argentina, 6 Jun 1957) was an Argentine association football goalkeeper. Nicknamed El Vasco, Buruca Laforia is considered the first great goalkeeper of Argentina.

Career
Although Buruca was short height to play as goalkeeper, his intuition made him to be just in time under the goal. His playing style (usually getting away from the goal area) made Alumni's captain Jorge Brown told him off several times. He is considered a predecessor of other goalkeepers such as Ubaldo Fillol or Hugo Gatti.

Buruca started his career playing for Central Athletic Club, then moving to Barracas A.C. where he stayed until 1904. That same year he was the goalkeeper in the first international match played by an Argentine side v. a British team, Southampton in Buenos Aires. In 1905 he moved to Alumni, along with forward Carlos Lett. Buruca won 3 Primera División championships among other titles.

In 1909 Buruca moved to Independiente where he played until 1911, then playing for Argentino de Quilmes and Racing Club de Avellaneda. After his father died, Buruca decided to quit from football.

Buruca was the first goalkeeper to play for the Argentina national team in an official match, playing v. Uruguay in Montevideo on July 20, 1902. Buruca only played four times for Argentina, being his last match on August 15, 1907 vs. Uruguay for the Copa Lipton. He was injured at 60' and replaced by forward Alfredo Brown who had to switch to goalkeeper because substitutions were not allowed by then. His goal remained unbeaten, setting a record.

Honours
Alumni
Primera División (3):  1905, 1906, 1907
Copa de Honor Municipalidad de Buenos Aires (2): 1905, 1906
Copa de Competencia Jockey Club (2): 1907, 1908 
Tie Cup (6): 1906, 1907 
Copa de Honor Cousenier (1): 1906

References

1884 births
1957 deaths
Argentine footballers
Association football goalkeepers
Argentina international footballers
Argentine Primera División players
Alumni Athletic Club players
Club Atlético Independiente footballers
Racing Club de Avellaneda footballers
Footballers from Buenos Aires
Spanish emigrants to Argentina